Claire Newell is a travel expert, media personality, best-selling author, luggage designer, journalist, and founder and president of Travel Best Bets (1993) which has over 325 agents.

For the past 29 years she has appeared as a regular contributor on Global TV BC (five times/week), CKNW Radio (three times/week), AM640 Radio Toronto (one time/week), and is on Global TVs national 'The Morning Show' regularly. Claire has been a guest multiple times on the Today, Fox & Friends, Good Day New York, ABC Morning News – Chicago, and CNN Radio.

She has been a spokesperson for Scenic (cruise line), Disney, Hilton Hotels & Resorts, Vancouver International Airport, Conrad Hotels & Resorts, Dukoral for Valneva, Bridgestone Tires, CHASE Sapphire Preferred Card and TD Bank. She has been featured in ads and promotions for Visit Las Vegas, Visit Laguna Beach, Visit Anaheim, Vancouver International Airport, Hong Kong Tourism Board, BC Ferries, Canadian Tourism College, the Canadian Tourism Commission.

Claire is a best-selling author of Travel Best Bets - An Insider's Guide to Taking Your Best Trip, Ever. She has also authored or been featured in articles for SUCCESS, Professional Woman, Today's Parent, Reader's Digest and for various newspapers. She was a co-host for the travel series Operation: Vacation which aired in the US Logo TV, Canada T+E and affiliate stations internationally.

Claire is a regular speaker at travel events in the U.S. and Canada. Having visited over 74 countries, with many more on her bucket list, Claire provides her audience with the tips and deals to make their travels happen.

Claire lives in Vancouver, BC with her husband and 2 children.

References

External links
Claire Newell's Website
Disney Family Travel - Claire Newell Bio
The Today Show with Matt Lauer 
ABC Money Matters

Year of birth missing (living people)
Living people
Businesspeople from British Columbia
Canadian women in business
Writers from British Columbia